Kathleen A. Ethier is an American social psychologist and public health official with the Centers for Disease Control and Prevention (CDC). In 2016, she was appointed the Director of CDC's Division of Adolescent and School Health in the National Center for HIV/AIDS, Viral Hepatitis, STD, and TB Prevention. As of 2020, Ethier is also head of the CDC's community mitigation task force for the COVID-19 pandemic.

Biography
Ethier received her PhD in social psychology from the City University of New York (CUNY), examining women's reaction to their initial pregnancy. She researched at Yale University for six years, working on the prevention of HIV and other sexually transmitted diseases in women.

She joined the CDC in 1999, where she served as Adolescent Health Goal Team Leader (2007–09) and Associate Director in the Public Health Practice of the National Center for Chronic Disease Prevention and Health Promotion (2009–10), and then directed the Program, Performance and Evaluation Office in the CDC Director's Office (2010–16), before taking up her current appointment. At the CDC, with Laura Kann and Timothy McManus, she carried out a decade-long survey of risky behavior in young people in 29 U.S. states, published in 2018, which found that a decreasing proportion of high-school students stated that they had experienced sexual intercourse.

In 2020, as head of the CDC's COVID-19 community mitigation task force, researching non-pharmaceutical interventions to prevent spread of the virus, she was the lead author on a comparative study of cell phone usage – used as a measure of people's mobility – in the metropolitan areas of New York City, Seattle, New Orleans and the Bay Area after shelter-at-home orders were issued, which showed that a reduction in mobility was accompanied by a decrease in the growth rate of COVID-19 cases.

Selected publications
Arielle Lasry, Daniel Kidder et al., Kathleen A. Ethier (2020). Timing of community mitigation and changes in reported COVID-19 and community mobility ― four U.S. metropolitan areas, February 26–April 1, 2020. Morbidity and Mortality Weekly Report , 
Laura Kann, Tim McManus et al., Kathleen A. Ethier (2018). Youth Risk Behavior Surveillance — United States, 2017. Morbidity and Mortality Weekly Report Surveillance Summaries, 67: 1–114. ,  (cited 898 times on Google Scholar)
Kathleen A. Ethier, Kay Deaux (1994). Negotiating social identity when contexts change: Maintaining identification and responding to threat. Journal of Personality and Social Psychology, 67: 243–251 (cited 1090 times on Google Scholar)

References  

American social psychologists
Centers for Disease Control and Prevention people
City University of New York alumni
Year of birth missing (living people)
Living people